The Stadio Libero Liberati is a multi-use stadium in Terni, Italy.  It is currently used mostly for football matches and the home of Ternana Unicusano Calcio. The stadium was built in 1969 and holds 17,460.

The stadium was named after Libero Liberati, a motorcycle racer who died in 1962.

References

Libero Liberati
Terni
Ternana Calcio
Sports venues in Umbria
Libero